The Haunting of Molly Hartley is a 2008 American supernatural horror film written by John Travis and Rebecca Sonnenshine and directed by Mickey Liddell. The film, starring Haley Bennett, Chace Crawford, AnnaLynne McCord, and Jake Weber, was a critical failure but a mild commercial success.

Plot
The film begins with a teenage girl, Laurel Miller (Jessica Lowndes), going into the woods to meet her boyfriend Michael (Randy Wayne). He gives her an early birthday present, but her father (Jamie McShane) shows up and demands that she leave with him. As they drive home, Laurel tells him that she will be marrying Michael as soon as she turns eighteen. He breaks down and apologizes to her, telling her he can't let her turn 18, then purposely crashes their car. Seeing that she is not dead, he kills her with a broken piece of mirror, saying he couldn't let the darkness take her.

In present day, 17-year-old Molly Hartley (Haley Bennett) is stabbed in the chest by her deranged mother Jane (Marin Hinkle) with a pair of scissors. Although she survives, she is haunted in her dreams by the experience. She lives with her father Robert (Jake Weber), and her mother is locked up in a mental ward. Her father enrolls Molly in a new school to help with the trauma and start a new life. However, as her eighteenth birthday approaches, Molly has continuing nightmares of her mother's attack. Joseph Young (Chace Crawford), one of her classmates, attempts to help her; however, she begins to display symptoms of the same psychosis that took control of her mother's life. Molly attends a party at Joseph's house, where his jealous ex-girlfriend tries to attack her. She breaks the girl's arm and leaves the party. She has another hallucination of her mother attacking her and has a panic attack. The next morning she apologizes to Joseph's ex, who says she knows what Molly is.

At home, Molly is cornered by her mother and discovers that she and others want to kill her in order to save her from a preordained life as a servant to Satan. It is revealed that Molly had died as the result of a miscarriage and her parents made a pact with the Devil to save her life. The terms of the agreement were such that the Hartleys would only have Molly until her eighteenth birthday, then she would belong to the Devil. After Jane is accidentally killed, and upon knocking her father out, Molly runs to seek salvation by accepting a baptism by Alexis, who tries to drown her. Alexis accidentally is knocked on her head, which kills her and Molly turns to Joseph for help, only to discover that he is one of them and has set her up.

Dr. Emerson (Nina Siemaszko) arrives at Joseph's house and tells Molly that she is also to be a servant of the devil. She says Molly can either kill her father to break the pact, or submit. She tries to let her father live and avoid her fate by attempting suicide with a kitchen knife. This attempt is in vain because the clock has already struck midnight.

The film switches to a mental institution, where a doctor is talking to a woman dressed in black, later revealed to be a cold-hearted Molly. Molly's father has now been admitted to the institution; Molly smiles and says she will not speak to him, choosing to move on. She becomes valedictorian of her high school and dates Joseph. She is seen leaving her high school graduation with Joseph in a limousine, after being told by Dr. Emerson (disguised as the school guidance counselor) that they'll "see her soon."

Cast

 Haley Bennett as Molly Hartley
 Jake Weber as Robert Hartley
 Chace Crawford as Joseph Young
 Shannon Woodward as Leah
 Shanna Collins as Alexis White
 AnnaLynne McCord as Suzie Woods
 Marin Hinkle as Jane Hartley
 Nina Siemaszko as Dr. Amelia Emerson
 Josh Stewart as Mr. Draper
 Jessica Lowndes as Laurel Miller
 Randy Wayne as Michael
 Jamie McShane as Mr. Miller
 Ron Canada as Mr. Bennett
 Kevin Cooney as Dr. Donaldson
 Ross Thomas as Jock
 Charles Chun as Doctor
 John Newton as Mr. Young

Release

Box office
The Haunting of Molly Hartley opened theatrically on October 31, 2008, in 2,652 venues, earning $5,423,315 in its opening weekend, ranking number five and second among the weekend's new releases. The film ended its run on February 5, 2009, having grossed $13,559,812 in the domestic box office and $1,858,937 overseas for a worldwide total of $15,418,749. Based on an estimated $5 million budget, the film was a minor box office success.

Critical reception
The film was widely panned and currently holds a 28/100 rating on Metacritic, based on 10 reviews and a 3% "Rotten" score on Rotten Tomatoes based on 40 reviews, with the site's critical consensus being "The Haunting of Molly Hartley is a rather lifeless horror endeavor, with a pedestrian plot and few scares."  Its best review came from the Toronto Star which said "If you get past the retro Nancy Drew title, this is a worthwhile effort." The LA Weekly wrote "From Freestyle Releasing, the self-service distributor that brought you D-War and In the Name of the King: A Dungeon Siege Tale, comes a movie even worse than those two combined."

Frank Scheck for The Hollywood Reporter called the film "a teen-oriented horror opus that wouldn't pass muster on the CW network." Keith Phipps for The A.V. Club gave the film a D+ and said "It's a horror film better suited for skittish cats than humans."

Home media
Originally independently released by Freestyle Releasing, all ancillary rights reverted to 20th Century Fox upon its DVD release on February 24, 2009, via Fox's home video division, since Fox holds rights to release Freestyle films on DVD. The film was released in Mexico on June 4, 2010, via Quality Films. The UK DVD was released on June 14, 2010.

Soundtrack
Although a formal soundtrack was never released, the following songs were used in the film:
 "Preparedness" by The Bird and the Bee
 "I Don't Wanna" by Anna Waronker
 "Rain" by Bishop Allen
 "Post Man" by The Sammies
 "17" by X-Press 2
 "Falling Out" by The Sammies
 "U a Freak (Nasty Girl)" by Chingy
 "Mad Scientist" by Madison
 "Untouched and Intact" by The Honorary Title
 "Overwhelmed" by Keren DeBerg

Sequel
A sequel, The Exorcism of Molly Hartley, was released direct-to-DVD on October 9, 2015. The film, directed by Steven R. Monroe, stars Sarah Lind as Molly with a supporting cast of Devon Sawa, Gina Holden, and Jon Cor.

References

External links
 
 
 
 

2008 films
2008 horror films
2000s horror thriller films
2008 independent films
2000s psychological horror films
2008 psychological thriller films
2000s supernatural films
2000s teen horror films
American horror thriller films
American independent films
American psychological horror films
American psychological thriller films
American supernatural horror films
American supernatural thriller films
American teen horror films
Films set in the 1990s
Films shot in Los Angeles
Religious horror films
2000s English-language films
2000s American films